East Brixton railway station was a railway station in Brixton, south London. It was opened as Loughborough Park by the London, Brighton & South Coast Railway in 1866. Regular passenger service was the South London line from London Victoria to London Bridge terminal stations in central London. Initially provided with a steam passenger service, competition from electric trams caused a conversion to overhead line electric operation in 1909. The station became part of the Southern Railway in 1923 and overhead line electrification was swapped for third rail in 1928. The station lost patronage after the opening of Brixton Underground station in 1971. There was a fire at the station in 1975 and it was closed by British Rail in January 1976. The station was located next to the rail bridge over Barrington Road, near Coldharbour Lane. Since 2012 London Overground trains pass through the site of the former station without stopping and there has been some campaigning to reopen it.

History
The inner south London suburb of Brixton in the parish of Lambeth was connected to central London by rail on 25 August 1862 when Brixton and South Stockwell railway station was opened by the London, Chatham and Dover Railway (LCDR) on the line from Victoria through Brixton to Herne Hill. East Brixton station was opened on 13 August 1866 by the London, Brighton & South Coast Railway (LBSCR) as Loughborough Park. It consisted of two platforms with wooden buildings on high piers next to the railway viaduct. Initially the station was the western terminus of the steam passenger service from London Bridge. Through service was established to Victoria on 1 May 1867. The next station to the east was Denmark Hill and the next station to the west was Clapham (now called Clapham High Street).

In 1870 the station was renamed Loughborough Park and Brixton, before it was finally renamed East Brixton in 1894. 

The station was included in a proposal published in 1905 by the Australian engineer Elfric Wells Chalmers Kearney for an underground monorail-type railway.

The popularity of the service was threatened by the development of the electric tram network and the line through the station converted to electric operation in 1909, powered by overhead line. In 1923 the LBSCR was grouped into the Southern Railway. The Southern Railway had more miles of third rail track than overhead line so in 1928 the electric traction system on the route was switched.

After nationalisation of the railways the line and station became part of the Southern Region of British Railways.

East Brixton station made a brief appearance in the 1948 comedy film A Date with a Dream. It is seen in the background of a scene in which two soldiers (played by Len Lowe and Bill Lowe) walk along Barrington Road.

Over the years the station became progressively neglected and lost passengers from 1971 when Brixton Underground station opened nearby as the southern terminus of the new Victoria line. With declining passenger numbers and the station requiring extensive repairs to the wooden platforms and buildings it was decided that the expense was not justified. There was a fire in 1975 which temporarily closed the station but the station reopened and was finally closed on 5 January 1976.  The platforms and its buildings were demolished shortly after closure. Nothing now remains of the station at track level: there are some arches and windows in the viaduct of the still used line.

Reopening proposals

In 2012, most of the South London Line service was incorporated into the London Overground network as part of the East London line extension project. Trains now run from Clapham Junction to Wandsworth Road, follow the same route to Queens Road Peckham, then join the East London line core route at Surrey Quays. This service runs through Brixton, East Brixton and Loughborough Junction without stopping. The plans were criticised for missed opportunities to create new interchange stations with Thameslink and the Victoria line. No stations are planned at these locations as the line is on high railway arches, making the cost of any station construction prohibitive. 

In 2014 it was suggested that a re-opened East Brixton station could provide a form of interchange with the Victoria line and Thameslink as it would be located almost exactly in the middle of the two lines. This was the subject of a petition to parliament. In March 2017, Lambeth Council started a review to see if there was a business case for reopening the station, working with Transport for London and Network Rail. 

In August 2017, Labour MP for Vauxhall Florence Eshalomi and Conservative member of the London Assembly, Andrew Boff called for the station to be re-opened.

In August 2018, the Liberal Democrats along with London Assembly member Caroline Pidgeon and the Lambeth Liberal Democrats called for the reopening of East Brixton, by launching a petition.

Maps

References

Further reading

Disused railway stations in the London Borough of Lambeth
Former London, Brighton and South Coast Railway stations
Railway stations in Great Britain opened in 1866
Railway stations in Great Britain closed in 1976
Brixton
History of the London Borough of Lambeth